Loftus, previously Lofthouse, was a railway station on the Whitby, Redcar and Middlesbrough Union Railway. It was opened on 1 April 1875 as the terminus of a line from Saltburn, and served the town of Loftus. When the line to Whitby was opened on 3 December 1883, it became a through station with two platforms and a goods yard consisting of three sidings. It closed to passenger traffic on 2 May 1960 and goods traffic on 12 August 1963; the tracks through the station were lifted in 1964.

Though a single track was relaid from Skinningrove by 1 April 1974 to allow freight trains to reach Boulby Mine, the station remains closed, and most buildings have been demolished. The stationmaster's house is now a private residence, the large brick-build goods shed also remains standing.

References

Further reading

External links
 Loftus station on navigable 1955 O. S. map

Disused railway stations in Redcar and Cleveland
Former North Eastern Railway (UK) stations
Railway stations in Great Britain opened in 1875
Railway stations in Great Britain closed in 1960
Loftus, North Yorkshire